Bukač may refer to:

Luděk Bukač
Radek Bukač
Fanfrnoch, also known as bukač